WMUP (99.9 FM) was a radio station formerly licensed to Carney, Michigan. The station was owned by Starboard Media Foundation, Inc. and was granted its license on April 15, 2008. The station's license was cancelled and its call sign deleted by the Federal Communications Commission on February 1, 2012.

Sources 
Michiguide.com - WMUP History

External links

MUP
Radio stations disestablished in 2012
Defunct radio stations in the United States
Radio stations established in 2008
Defunct religious radio stations in the United States
2008 establishments in Michigan
2012 disestablishments in Michigan
MUP